The Blue Lagoon is a French cocktail featuring blue Curaçao mixed with vodka and lemonade. It is typically garnished with an orange slice or a lemon slice. A Blue Lagoon is typically served in a highball glass.

One variation adds a dash of lime cordial to the mix. Another variation with a dash of raspberry cordial or grenadine is known as a "fruit tingle", after the Australian candy of that name.

See also
 List of cocktails

References
 1000 Classic Cocktails. .

Cocktails with vodka
Cocktails with lemonade
Cocktails with triple sec or curaçao